Hajnsko is a settlement in the Municipality of Šmarje pri Jelšah in eastern Slovenia. It lies in the hills southeast of Šmarje on both banks of Hajnsko Creek. The area is part of the traditional region of Styria. The municipality is now included in the Savinja Statistical Region.

References

External links
Hajnsko at Geopedia

Populated places in the Municipality of Šmarje pri Jelšah